Joseph Anthony "Bananas" Benes (January 8, 1901 – March 7, 1975) was an infielder in Major League Baseball. He played for the St. Louis Cardinals in 1931.

Branch Rickey added Benes to the Cardinals' roster in May 1931. Given that Benes was 30 years old at the time, Rickey stated that Benes was not regarded as a future prospect but as "reserve strength" to back up shortstop Charlie Gelbert. By June 17, 1931, however, he was replaced on the roster by infielder Jakie Flowers and returned to the minors.

References

External links

1901 births
1975 deaths
Major League Baseball infielders
St. Louis Cardinals players
People from Long Island City, Queens
Minor league baseball managers
Springfield Ponies players
Sportspeople from Queens, New York
Baseball players from New York City
Albany Senators players
Baltimore Orioles (IL) players
Columbus Senators players
Dallas Steers players
Jersey City Skeeters players
New Haven Profs players
Newark Bears players
Pittsfield Hillies players
Rochester Colts players
Syracuse Chiefs players
Syracuse Stars (minor league baseball) players